Ungunicus is a genus of braconid wasps in the family Braconidae. There is at least one described species in Ungunicus, U. vietnamensis, found in Vietnam.

References

Microgastrinae